According to the Book of Genesis, Naphtali was the last of the two sons of Jacob and Bilhah (Jacob's sixth son). He was the founder of the Israelite Tribe of Naphtali.

Some biblical commentators have suggested that the name Naphtali may refer to the struggle between Rachel and Leah for the favours of Jacob. Bilhah was the handmaid of Rachel, who was infertile at the time, and had persuaded Jacob to have a child with Bilhah as a proxy for having one with herself.

Biblical references
According to the Targum Pseudo-Jonathan, Naphtali was a swift runner, though this appears to have been inferred from the Blessing of Jacob, which equates Naphtali to a hind. However, Biblical scholars believe this to actually be a description of the tribe of Naphtali.

Naphtali is listed in Deuteronomy 34.2 when God takes Moses up to the mountain of Nebo and shows him the extent of the land which he had promised to Abraham, Isaac and Jacob. See article on Tribe of Simeon for a map of the twelve tribes of Israel.

Family
The name of his wife/wives are not given. He and his family migrated to Egypt, with the rest of the clan, where they remained until the Exodus.

According to the apocryphal Testament of the Twelve Patriarchs, he died at 137 and was buried in Egypt.

Testament of Naphtali 

In this apocryphal material, Naphtali gave his sons no commandment except regarding the fear of God, that they should serve Him and follow after Him, also admonished them not to join themselves unto the sons of Joseph but join the sons of Levi and Judah. He also had a vision about the division of tribes of Israel and told to them that Abraham was chosen by God for his faith.

Notes

References

External links

Founders of biblical tribes
Children of Jacob

de:Naftali